The Tahukou River is a river in Yunlin County, Taiwan. It is a tributary of Huwei River, which itself is a tributary Beigang River.

See also
List of rivers in Taiwan

References

Rivers of Taiwan
Landforms of Yunlin County